The Provisional Government of East Timor (PGET),, was an Indonesian supported puppet provisional government in present day East Timor that was formed on 17 December 1975 following the Indonesian invasion of East Timor and disbanded on 17 July 1976 when the region was annexed by Indonesia as the province of Timor Timur.

History

Decolonisation and unilateral declaration of independence

East Timor was colonised by Portugal in the mid-16th century and administered as Portuguese Timor. After the 1974 Carnation Revolution in Portugal, a decolonisation process was initiated  which was to have led to the formation of an elected Constituent Assembly in 1976. Three new parties emerged at this time; the Timorese Democratic Union which advocated continued association with Portugal, Fretilin which supported independence and Apodeti who supported integration into Indonesia. In local elections held on 13 March 1975, Fretilin and UDT emerged as the largest parties, having previously formed an alliance to campaign for independence.

On 28 November 1975, Fretilin made a unilateral declaration of independence of the Democratic Republic of East Timor in an act not recognised by either Portugal or Indonesia.

Indonesian invasion and annexation

On 30 November 1979, In response to the unilateral declaration of Independence Indonesia encouraged leaders of the UDT, Apodeti, and other smaller parties to sign the Balibo Declaration calling for integration of East Timor into Indonesia. On the morning of 7 December 1975, Indonesian forces launched a massive air and sea invasion of East Timor, known as Operasi Seroja (Operation Lotus) capturing Dili later that afternoon.

On 17 December an Indonesian supported Provisional Government of East Timor was formed with by Arnaldo dos Reis Araújo of Apodeti as Chief Executive and Lopez da Cruz of the UDT as Deputy Chief Executive. On 31 May 1976 a Popular Representative Assembly was established  which subsequently adopted a resolution calling for the formal integration of East Timor into Indonesia, which the Indonesian Government described as "an act of self-determination" for East Timor.

On 17 July 1976, Indonesia through Presidential Decree RI No. 113 of 1976, Law no. 7 of 1976 and MPR Decree No. VI/MPR/1978, formally annexed East Timor as the province of Timor Timur with PGET President Arnaldo dos Reis Araújo becoming its first governor.

Balibo Declaration and Petition for Integration

Balibo Declaration
The "Balibo Declararion" was signed by representatives of Apodeti, UDT, KOTA and the Trabalhista Party on 30 November 1975.
Indonesian

English translation

Petition for integration
The Provisional Government of East Timor made the following petition for the region to join Indonesia on 31 May 1976:

Structure

Leadership
Chief Executive of the Provisional Government of East Timor

Deputy Chief Executive of the Provisional Government of East Timor

Popular Representative Assembly
The Popular Representative Assembly of East Timor was formed on 31 May 1976 by Act Number 1/1976 of the Provisional Government of East Timor. The Assembly had 50 members included representatives of a Deliberative Council formed at the same time as the PGET and two members from each of the 13 municipalities of East Timor. Indonesia claimed the members included representatives and leaders from all walks of East Timorese life including prominent citizens, tribal chiefs religious leaders and municipal representatives. The chairman of the assembly was Guilherme Gonçalves.

Municipal popular assemblies
Each municipality in East Timor had a popular assembly of between 15 and 20 members.

International relations
The Provisional Government of East Timor maintained a liaison office in Jakarta, Indonesia. The office was led by Mário Viegas Carrascalão.

References

Government of East Timor
History of East Timor
History of Timor
Provisional governments